Lectionary 216, designated by siglum ℓ 216 (in the Gregory-Aland numbering) is a Greek manuscript of the New Testament, on parchment. Palaeographically it has been assigned to the 13th century. 
Scrivener labelled it by 251evl and 64apost.

Description 

The codex contains 19 lessons from the Gospels, Acts, and Epistles  lectionary (Evangelistarium, Apostolarium), on 60 parchment leaves, with some lacunae. The text is written in Greek minuscule letters, in one column per page, 17 lines per page.

It contains the liturgies of Chrysostom, of Basil, and of the Presanctified Gifts (the same ones as Lectionary 223). It has some pictures and decorations. At the foot of folio 57 verso is a fair picture of an angel with golden glory.

No iota adscriptum or iota subscriptum is found. There is no very special critical value in the readings.

History 

Scrivener dated the manuscript to the 12th or 13th century, Gregory to the 12th century. It has been assigned by the Institute for New Testament Textual Research (INTF) to the 13th century. The name of the scribe is unknown.

Of the history of the codex nothing is known until 1864, when it was in the possession of a dealer at Janina in Epeiros. It was then purchased from him by a representative of Baroness Burdett-Coutts (1814–1906), a philanthropist, along with other Greek manuscripts. They were transported to England in 1870-1871. The manuscript was presented by Burdett-Coutts to Sir Roger Cholmely's School, and was housed at the Highgate (Burdett-Coutts I. 10), in London.

The manuscript was added to the list of New Testament manuscripts by Scrivener (number 251) and Gregory (number 216). Gregory saw it in 1883. It was used by Charles Anthony Swainson for his treatise on the Greek Liturgies (Introduction (1884),  p. XXI).

In 1922 it was acquired for the University of Michigan. 

The manuscript is not cited in the critical editions of the Greek New Testament (UBS3).

The codex is housed at the University  of Michigan (Ms. 49) in Ann Arbor, Michigan.

See also 

 List of New Testament lectionaries
 Biblical manuscript
 Textual criticism

Notes and references

Bibliography 

 Frederick Henry Ambrose Scrivener, Adversaria Critica Sacra: With a Short Explanatory Introduction (Cambridge, 1893), pp. LXVI-LXVII (as u)
 Kenneth W. Clark, A Descriptive Catalogue of Greek New Testament Manuscripts in America (Chicago, 1937), p. 317.

External links 

 Images of Lectionary 216 at the CSNTM

Greek New Testament lectionaries
13th-century biblical manuscripts
Palimpsests